The Lightle House is a historic house on County Road 76 in White County, Arkansas, just north of the Searcy city limits.  It is a single story wood-frame structure, with a side gable roof, a shed-roof porch across the front, and a central chimney.  An addition extends to the rear, giving it a T shape, with a second chimney projecting from that section.  Built about 1920, it is the county's only known surviving example of a saddlebag house.

The house was listed on the National Register of Historic Places in 1992.

See also
Ben Lightle House (301 East Market Avenue, Searcy, Arkansas)
Lightle House (107 North Elm Street, Searcy, Arkansas)
Lightle House (605 Race Avenue, Searcy, Arkansas)
William H. Lightle House (601 East Race Street, Searcy, Arkansas)
National Register of Historic Places listings in White County, Arkansas

References

Houses on the National Register of Historic Places in Arkansas
Houses completed in 1920
Houses in White County, Arkansas
National Register of Historic Places in White County, Arkansas
1920 establishments in Arkansas
Double pen architecture in the United States